The Cross of Merit is a Polish civil state decoration established on 23 June 1923, to recognize services to the state.

History 
At the time of its establishment in 1923, the Cross of Merit was the highest civilian award in Poland. It was awarded to citizens who went beyond the call of duty in their work for the country and society as a whole. May be awarded twice in each grade to the same person.

The Order 
The Order has three grades:

Recipients

Gold Cross of Merit

Silver Cross of Merit

Bronze Cross of Merit

See also 
 Cross of Merit (Polish Scouting and Guiding Association)

References 

Awards established in 1923
1923 establishments in Poland